In Search of Sanity is the third studio album by English thrash metal band Onslaught, released in 1989. This album was originally recorded with Sy Keeler, but London Records were not impressed with the final product from a commercial point of view and enforced a re-mix and a complete re-recording of the vocals by Grim Reaper frontman Steve Grimmett, being the only album featuring him. It features their longest song to date "Welcome to Dying". 

While the album was mostly in the same thrash/speed metal vein as The Force, it contains a more polished sound than Onslaught's previous albums, acquiring a more progressive and melodic edge. Despite meeting mixed reviews by their fans, In Search of Sanity was moderately successful, peaking at number 46 on the UK charts while the single "Let There Be Rock" peaked at number 50 in that country. It was also Onslaught's last album before disbanding in 1991, only to reform in 2004 and the release of their fourth album Killing Peace in 2007.

The album was remastered and re-released by Blackend Records on 30 October 2006, after being out of print for some years.

Track listing

Note
In 2016, the album was packaged by Dissonance Productions containing a second disc of a recorded live concert in 1989 at the Bristol Hippodrome. The track listing is as follows:

Personnel
Onslaught
Steve Grimmett - vocals
Nige Rockett - guitar
Rob Trottman - guitar
James Hinder - bass, backing vocals
Steve Grice - drums, backing vocals

Additional musicians
 Jody Gray, Dave Taggart, Phil Caffrey, Masaki Yamada, Stephan Galfas - backing vocals
 Steve Laws-Clifford - keyboards

Production
Stephan Galfas - producer, engineer, mixing
Paul Mortimor, Richard Barraclough, Jean Baptiste Liere - engineers
Noah "T.T." Baron - mixing

References

1989 albums
Onslaught (band) albums
London Records albums